Qarah Bolagh (also Romanized as Qarah Bolāgh, Ghara Bolagh, Qarā Bolāgh, Qara Bulāq, and Qareh Bolāgh) is a village in Hesar-e Valiyeasr Rural District, Central District, Avaj County, Qazvin Province, Iran. At the 2006 census, its population was 165, in 40 families.

References 

Populated places in Avaj County